The Tender Warrior is a 1971 film directed by Stewart Raffill and starring Dan Haggerty and Charles Lee. It was Raffill's debut feature as director.

Cast
Dan Haggerty as Cal
Charles Lee as Sammy 
Liston Elkins as Pa Lucas

Production
Raffill was an animal supervisor who would rent animals to films and TV series. He saved up enough money to finance this film. It was shot at the Okefenokee Swamp in Georgia. Raffill sold it to Warner Bros, was unhappy with what they did with it, bought it back, and re-distributed it.

References

External links

1971 films
Films directed by Stewart Raffill
Films set in Georgia (U.S. state)
Films about animals
1971 directorial debut films
1970s English-language films